David Graeme Salveson Macmillan  (born Edinburgh, Scotland 12 September 1935) is a Scottish actor and former advertising agent.

He was privately educated and served as an army officer. He trained at the Webber Douglas Academy of Dramatic Art (1956–1958), where he won the Spotlight Award and the Margaret Rutherford Medal.

Career 
Between 1958 and 1967, he played a very broad range of parts in repertory at Birmingham Alex (two years), Edinburgh Gateway and Edinburgh Lyceum, Glasgow Citizens, Harrogate, St. Andrews, Wimbledon, Richmond, Colchester, Salisbury, Belfast amongst others. As a young actor, he met his wife Morag, whilst they were both appearing in pantomime. They now have three children and live in Crieff and East Sheen. He has appeared extensively in radio, in Children's Hour, The Archers, plays and school broadcasts. He made over fifty television appearances between 1960 and 1967 including: eighteen episodes of Dr Finlay's Casebook (as Constable Dickie), ten episodes of The Flying Swan, eight episodes of The George Kidd Show, The Dark Number, Compact, The Saint, William, The Other Man, North Flight, Kipling, No Thoroughfare, Pack Up Your Troubles, The Big Pull, and Gideon's Way.

He led a highly successful senior management career in recruitment advertising and marketing in London between 1967 and 1995. Upon his retirement in 1995, he returned to acting and has also dealt in antiques. He has had successful runs at the Chichester Festival Theatre and in the West End, as the valet 'Lane', in Oscar Wilde's famous comedy The Importance of Being Earnest in 1999 and at the Pitlochry Festival Theatre as Lord Loam in J. M. Barrie's The Admirable Crichton and as Arthur Winslow, in Terence Rattigan's The Winslow Boy in 2001.

Acting career

Radio credits
 Children's Hour
 The Archers
 Radio plays
 School broadcasts

Television credits
 The Big Pull (1962)...playing "Dr. Harding" (two episodes) (BBC - Terence Dudley)
 Dr. Finlay's Casebook (1962) (TV Series) (ten episodes)...playing "PC Dickie" (eighteen episodes) (BBC - Campbell Logan, Gerald Blake, Cedric Messina and Julia Smith)
 The Flying Swan (ten episodes) 
 Studio Four (1962) in episode: "North Flight" (episode # 1.10) ... playing "Jeremy Sprig" (BBC Glasgow - James MacTaggart) 
 William (TV series) (1962)... playing "George" in episode: "William and the Parrots" (episode # 1.5) (BBC - Leonard Chase)
 Compact ... playing Graeme Keith (one episode) (BBC - Hugh Munro)
 The Other Man (1964)...playing "Ryder" (Granada - Gordon Flemyng)
 No Thoroughfare ... playing "Carstairs" (BBC - James MacTaggart)
 Pack Up Your Troubles ... playing "The Police" (BBC Glasgow - James MacTaggart)
 Coming Home (1996)...playing "Dobson"...aka Heimkeh (Germany)...aka Rosamunde Picher - Heimkeh (Germany)
 Taggart (1997)...playing "Martin Dawson" in episode: "Apocalypse"

Theatre credits
 Uncle Harry by Thomas Job ... as "Uncle Harry" (Webber-Douglas)
 Claudia by Rose Franken ...as "David" (Webber-Douglas)
 The Duchess of Malfi by Webster ... as "Bosola" (Webber-Douglas)
 Charley's Aunt by Brandon Thomas ... as "Charley" (Salisbury)
 Doctor in the House by Ted Willis ... as "Simon Sparrow" (Belfast)
 Cat on a Hot Tin Roof by Tennessee Williams ... as "Brick" (Belfast)
 See How they Run by Philip King ...as "Lionel" (Harrogate)
 Ring for Catty (by Patrick Cargill ... as "John Rhodes" (Harrogate)
 The Gioconda Smile by Aldous Huxley ... as "Dr Libbard" (Harrogate)
 As Long as They're Happy by Vernon Silvaine ... as "John Bentley" (Harrogate)
 Dial M for Murder by Frederick Knott ... as "Max Halliday" (Harrogate)
 Epitaph for George Dillon by John Osborne ... as "Geoffrey Colwyn-Stuart" (Harrogate)
 The Baikie Charivari by James Bridie ... as "Robert Copper" (Edinburgh Festival - Glasgow)
 The Master of Ballantrae by R.L.Stevenson ... as "The Master of Ballantrae" (Edinburgh)
 Miracle at Midnight by Tom Fleming ... as "The Man" (Edinburgh)
 The Skin of Our Teeth by Thornton Wilder ... as "Mr Fitzpatrick" (Edinburgh)
 The Country Boy by John Murphy ... as "Curly" (Edinburgh)
 Not in the Book by Arthur Watkyn ... as "Timothy Gregg" (Birmingham Alex)
 Caught Napping by Geoffrey Lumsden ...as Gordon Wilding (Birmingham Alex)
 The French Mistress by Robert Munro ... as "Peter" (Birmingham Alex)
 Present Laughter by Noël Coward ... as "Roland Maule" (Birmingham Alex)
 Guilty Party by George Ross and Campbell Singer ... as "Stanley Littlefield" (Birmingham Alex)
 Rookery Nook by Ben Travers ... as "Harold Twine" (Birmingham Alex)
 An Ideal Husband by Oscar Wilde ... as "Lord Goring" (Birmingham Alex)
 Black Coffee by Agatha Christie ... as "Richard" (Birmingham Alex)
 On Approval by Frederick Lonsdale ... as "George, Duke of Bristol" (Richmond)
 Towards Zero by Agatha Christie ... as "Neville" (Richmond)
 The Rehearsal by Jean Anouilh ... as "Hero" (Richmond)
 Guilty Party ... as "Roy Morgan" (Richmond)
 Private Lives by Noël Coward ... as Victor (Richmond)
 The Importance of Being Earnest by Oscar Wilde ... as "Lane" (Chichester)
 The Importance of Being Earnest by Oscar Wilde ... as "Lane" (Theatre Royal Haymarket)
 The Admirable Crichton by J. M. Barrie ...as "Lord Loam" (Pitlochry Festival Theatre)
 The Winslow Boy by Terence Rattigan ... as "Arthur Winslow" (Pitlochry Festival Theatre)

External links
 

1935 births
Living people
Scottish male film actors
Scottish male radio actors
Scottish male stage actors
Scottish male television actors
Male actors from Edinburgh
Alumni of the Webber Douglas Academy of Dramatic Art